Rosemary Susan Barnes, OBE (née Allen; born 16 May 1946) is an English charity organiser and former politician. She became nationally known when she won a by-election in 1987 for the Social Democratic Party.

Early life
Rosemary Allen was born in Nottingham to Alan Allen and Kathleen Allen and was educated at Bilborough Grammar School there, and at the University of Birmingham, where she graduated in Social Sciences and History in 1967. The same year she married Graham Barnes, an old school friend, who later became an accountant and investment company director. They have two sons and one daughter. After briefly becoming a teacher, she worked as a freelance market research consultant.

Political activity
Having been a Labour voter, although never a member, when the Social Democratic Party was formed in 1981 Barnes and her husband joined it as founder members because they were opposed to the Labour Party's leftward move. She served on the Council for Social Democracy from 1982 as the delegate from Greenwich, and was an SDP candidate in Woolwich in the Inner London Education Authority elections in May 1986.

Parliamentary candidature
Barnes was selected as SDP candidate for Greenwich in December 1986 after the previous candidate stood down, saying he did not want to be a "paper candidate" because the local SDP had decided to concentrate its efforts on keeping John Cartwright's seat in Woolwich. On Christmas Eve 1986, the Labour MP for the constituency (Guy Barnett) died, precipitating a by-election. The local Labour Party selected a left-wing candidate, and the Greenwich by-election held in February 1987 saw a deluge of canvassers, including many members of the Liberal Party, come from near and far to help her win the seat. Her husband, who in 1986 had become an SDP local councillor in Greenwich, acted as her agent at the subsequent 1987 general election four months later when she was returned.

National figure
Becoming a political star at the general election by virtue of her 'non-partisan' appeal, the SDP decided to use Barnes prominently in its campaign. She was shown in soft focus in a Party political broadcast teaching her son the way to stroke a rabbit, an appearance which was heavily ridiculed. She retained her seat with a lower majority. After the election, with the SDP split over whether to merge with the Liberal Party, Barnes strongly supported David Owen in his resistance to merger.

Role in SDP
Rosie Barnes became a member of Dr Owen's 'continuing' SDP, but when the party was disbanded in 1990 she continued to sit in Parliament as an 'Independent Social Democrat'. In the 1992 general election, despite being actively aided by the local Liberal Democrat party who did not put up a candidate against her and canvassed for her, she lost her seat to Nick Raynsford of the Labour Party.

After Parliament
After leaving politics Barnes became a charity director, first for the Royal College of Obstetricians and Gynaecologists at Birthright (which she renamed WellBeing), and subsequently as Chief Executive of the Cystic Fibrosis Trust which she joined in October 1996 and from which she retired in August 2010. In 2011 she accepted an invitation to become Patron of Child Health International, a charity dedicated to helping families affected by cystic fibrosis in former Soviet bloc countries.

Honours
Barnes was awarded an OBE for services to health care in 2011.

References

External links
 
 

1946 births
20th-century English women politicians
20th-century English politicians
Alumni of the University of Birmingham
English marketing people
Female members of the Parliament of the United Kingdom for English constituencies
Independent politicians in England
Living people
Officers of the Order of the British Empire
Politicians from Nottingham
Social Democratic Party (UK) MPs for English constituencies
Social Democratic Party (UK, 1988) MPs
UK MPs 1983–1987
UK MPs 1987–1992